Robert Lorne McCuish (25 May 1923 – 4 May 1998) was a Progressive Conservative party member of the House of Commons of Canada. McCuish was born in Winnipeg, Manitoba and became a claims manager by career.

He represented British Columbia's Prince George—Bulkley Valley after winning the seat in the 1979 federal election. He won re-election in the 1980 and 1984 federal elections. He left federal politics in 1988 and was not a candidate for that year's elections. McCuish served terms in the 31st, 32nd and 33rd Canadian Parliaments.

External links
 
  House of Commons tribute to McCuish.

1923 births
1998 deaths
Members of the House of Commons of Canada from British Columbia
Politicians from Winnipeg
Progressive Conservative Party of Canada MPs